The Rajasthan Public Service Commission (RPSC) is a body with authority under the Constitution of India to select applicants for appointment to civil service jobs in the Indian state of Rajasthan according to the merits of the applicants and the rules of reservation. It advises the government of Rajasthan on all matters relating to the rules of recruitment, appointment, transfer, promotion, professional standards and disciplinary action of civil servants. In this capacity, the commission organizes recruitment procedures, competitive examinations and screening tests, and candidate interview boards for the appointment of officers to civil service and civil posts within the state. 

The RPSC commenced its operations in 1949, when Rajasthan came into existence as a state. The commission has eight members who are supported and advised by the commission's secretariat staff. Its offices are located in Ajmer.

History

Functions
The RPSC is responsible for recruitment to various departments of the Rajasthan government and associated agencies, including all officers of the Rajasthan Administrative Service (RAS) and the Rajasthan Police Service (RPS). Since 2014, recruitment of the Clerical cadre has been delegated to the Rajasthan Subordinate and Ministerial Services Selection Board (RSMSSB) by authority of the "Rajasthan Public Service Commission (Limitation of Functions) Regulation, 1951". Selection for RAS, RPS, Rajasthan Technical Services, and Rajasthan Subordinate Services is made through competitive examination or interviews—or most commonly, by both—organized by the RPSC. The RPSC office is located at Jaipur road, Ajmer, Rajasthan.

See also
 List of Public service commissions in India
 Bhupendra Yadav, Director General of Police of Rajasthan, in the Indian Police Service
 RAS

References

External links 
 RPSC Official Website

State agencies of Rajasthan
1949 establishments in Rajasthan
State public service commissions of India